Dudo, or Dudon, was a Picard historian, and dean of Saint-Quentin, where he was born about 965. Sent in 986 by Albert I, Count of Vermandois, on an errand to Richard I, Duke of Normandy, he succeeded in his mission, and, having made a very favorable impression at the Norman court, spent some years in that country. During a second stay in Normandy, Dudo wrote his history of the Normans, a task which Duke Richard had urged him to undertake. Very little else is known about his life, except that he died before 1043.

Historia Normannorum

Written between 996 and 1015, his Historia Normannorum—also known as Libri III de moribus et actis primorum Normanniae ducum and Gesta Normannorum—was dedicated to Adalberon, bishop of Laon. Dudo does not appear to have consulted any existing documents for his history, but to have obtained his information from oral tradition, much of it being supplied by Raoul, count of Ivry, a maternal half-brother of Duke Richard. Consequently, the Historia partakes of the nature of a romance, and on this ground has been regarded as untrustworthy by historians such as Ernst Dümmler and Georg Waitz. Other authorities, such as Jules Lair and Johannes Steenstrup, while admitting the existence of a legendary element, regard the book as of considerable value for the history of the Normans.

In the introductory portion of this work, Dudo claims that he was a "frequent visitor of Duke Richard, the son of Marquess William" and that it was Richard who desired that Dudo should write this history of the Normans.  This would have been in the time period 994-996 in which later year Richard died.

Although Dudo was acquainted with Virgil (Aeneid) and other Latin writers, his Latin is affected and obscure. The Historia, which is written alternately in prose and in verse of several metres, is divided into four parts, and deals with the history of the Normans from 852 to the death of Duke Richard in 996. It glorifies the Normans, and was largely used by William of Jumièges, Wace, Robert of Torigni, William of Poitiers and Hugh of Fleury in compiling their chronicles.

More recently, Leah Shopkow has argued that Carolingian writing, particularly two saints' lives, the ninth-century Vita S. Germani by Heiric of Auxerre and the early tenth-century Vita S. Lamberti by Stephen of Liège, provided models for Dudo's work.

The work was first published by André Duchesne in his Historiae Normannorum scriptores antiqui, at Paris in 1619. Another edition is in the Patrologia Latina, tome cxli, of J. P. Migne (Paris, 1844), but the best is perhaps the one edited by J. Lair (Caen, 1865).

Dudo claims that Richard I of Normandy was sent by his father William I Longsword to learn the "Dacian" language with Bothon. Dudo stated in the same passage that the inhabitants of Bayeux more often spoke "Dacian" than "Roman" (i.e. Old French).

Notes

Edition and translation
French Translation: Lair, Jules (ed.). De moribus et actis primorum Normanniæ ducum. Mémoires de la Société des Antiquaires de Normandie 23. Caen, 1865. PDF scan available from Google Books.
English Translation: Christiansen, Eric. (tr.).  Dudo of St Quentin. History of the Normans. Woodbridge, 1998. .

Further reading
Dümmler, Ernst. Zur Kritik Dudos von St Quentin in the Forschungen zur deutschen Geschichte, Bande vi and ix (Göttingen, 1866)
Fauroux, M. Recueil des actes des dues de Normandie de 911 a 1066. Caen, 1961.
 Kortung, G. Uber die Quellen des Roman de Rou (Leipzig, 1867)
 Lair, J. Etude critique et historique sur Dudon (Caen, 1865)
 Molinier, A. Les Sources de l'histoire de France, tome ii (Paris, 1902)
 Shopkow, Leah. "The Carolingian World of Dudo of Saint-Quentin." Journal of Medieval History 15 (1989): 19-37.
 Steenstrup, J.C.H.R. Normannerne, Band i (Copenhagen 1876)
 Searle, E. "Fact and pattern in heroic history: Dudo of Saint-Quentin." Viator 15 (1984): 119-37.
 Wattenbach, W. Deutschlands Geschichtsquellen, Band i (Berlin, 1904)
Waitz, G. Uber die Quellen zur Geschichte der Begrundung der normannischen Herrschaft in Frankreich, in the Gottinger gel. Anzeigen (Göttingen, 1866)

External links
Dudo, Historia Normannorum:
Latin text and English translation, The Orb.
Latin text, Bibliotheca Augustana.
Latin text

Medieval Latin poets
11th-century Normans
960s births
11th-century deaths
11th-century French historians
French male poets
10th-century Normans
French male non-fiction writers
11th-century Latin writers

Year of birth uncertain
Year of death unknown